Futbola klubs Multibanka was a Latvian football club, playing in the second-highest division of Latvian football. They were from the city of Riga.

League and Cup history

References

Defunct football clubs in Latvia